Sir Nicholas Edward Underhill (born 12 May 1952), styled The Rt Hon. Lord Justice Underhill, is a British judge of the Court of Appeal of England and Wales.

He was educated at Winchester College and New College, Oxford.

Legal career
Underhill was called to the bar at Gray's Inn 1976 (elected a bencher 2000). He became a Queen's Counsel in 1992. He was appointed a Recorder in 1994 and was authorised as a deputy High Court judge in 1998. From 2000 to 2003, he was a temporary additional judge of the Employment Appeal Tribunal. He served as Attorney-General to the Prince of Wales from 1998 to 2006. On 30 January 2006, Underhill was appointed a High Court judge, receiving the customary knighthood, and assigned to the Queen's Bench Division. He was a judge of the Employment Appeal Tribunal from 2006 to 2013, and its president from 2009 to 2011. On 9 April 2013, he was appointed a Lord Justice of Appeal and consequently appointed to the Privy Council.

Underhill was chair of the Bar Pro Bono Unit (2002–2005). He has served as a trustee of St John's, Smith Square since 1996 and as chair since 2010. He is also a trustee of the London Library, having served since 2008, and has been vice chair since 2011.

He received an Honorary Fellowship from New College, Oxford in 2015.

List of cases
Wilson v United Kingdom [2002] ECHR 552, acting for the Daily Mail. Lost.
Byrne Bros (Formwork) Ltd v Baird [2002] ICR 667, subordination and dependence as the keys to employee status. Rejected by the Supreme Court in Clyde & Co LLP v Bates van Winkelhof [2014] UKSC 32, [39].
R v Barnet London Borough Council ex parte Nash, 2013 
Reilly v Secretary of State for Work and Pensions [2016] EWCA Civ 413, saying the government breached the Human Rights Act, but suggesting the government needed to do nothing
Pharmacists Defence Association Union v Secretary of State for Business, Innovation and Skills [2017] EWCA Civ 66, refusing recognition of a trade union, unless a sham union was first derecognised
Uber BV v Aslam [2018] EWCA Civ 2748, dissenting to hold drivers were not workers. Rejected by the Supreme Court, [2021] UKSC 5.
IWGB v Roofoods Ltd [2021] EWCA 952, holding Deliveroo cyclists did not have a human right to join trade unions
Adedeji v University Hospitals Birmingham NHS Foundation Trust [2021] EWCA Civ 23, Underhill approving the refusal of a claim that was 3 days late under the Equality Act 2010.

References

1952 births
Living people
People educated at Winchester College
Alumni of New College, Oxford
British barristers
Knights Bachelor
Members of Gray's Inn
Queen's Bench Division judges
Lords Justices of Appeal
Members of the Privy Council of the United Kingdom
English King's Counsel